is a railway station on the Kyūshū Railway Company (JR Kyūshū) Chikuhō Main Line (also known as the Wakamatsu Line) in Wakamatsu-ku, Kitakyushu, Fukuoka Prefecture, Japan.

Station layout

History
The station opened in 1899.

History 
On 1 October 1897, the Chikuho Kogyo Railway, now renamed the Chikuho Railway, merged with the Kyushu Railway. Kyushu Railway opened Futajima on 5 September 1899 as an additional station along
this stretch of track. After the Kyushu Railway was nationalized on 1 July 1907, Japanese Government Railways (JGR) took over control of the station. On 12 October 1909, the station became part of the Chikuho Main Line. With the privatization of Japanese National Railways (JNR), the successor of JGR, on 1 April 1987, control of the station passed to JR Kyushu.

On 4 March 2017, Futajima, along with several other stations on the line, became a "Smart Support Station".

Passenger statistics
In fiscal 2016, the station was used by an average of 1,412 passengers daily (boarding passengers only), and it ranked 122nd among the busiest stations of JR Kyushu.

Surrounding area
It is the westernmost train station among four stations in Wakamatsu-ku, all of those are on the Chikuho Main Line. National Route 199 runs immediately north of the station. Other points of interest include:
 Honjō Athletic Stadium - 1.5 km west 
 ÆON Wakamatsu Shopping Center - 0.5 km northwest
 Kōryō High School - 0.4 km northwest
 Fukuoka prefectural Wakamatsu Commercial High School - 1.3 km north-northwest
 Green Park Kitakyushu, Hibiki Animal World, Tonda reservoir - 4 km north-northwest

The nearest bus stops for Kitakyushu City Buses are located near the station along Route 199.

There is also a taxi stand outside the station's north exit.

References

External links
 Futajima Station 

Railway stations in Japan opened in 1899
Railway stations in Fukuoka Prefecture
Buildings and structures in Kitakyushu